Piletosoma thialis is a moth in the family Crambidae. It is found in Panama.

The wingspan is about 32 mm.

References

Moths described in 1914
Pyraustinae